Mount Katsufrakis is a projecting-type mountain on the east side of Markham Plateau in the Queen Elizabeth Range, Antarctica. It was mapped by the United States Geological Survey from tellurometer surveys and Navy air photos, 1960–62, and was named by the Advisory Committee on Antarctic Names for John P. Katsufrakis, a United States Antarctic Research Program radio scientist at McMurdo Station, 1963–64, and Byrd Station, 1964–65 and 1965–66.

References

External links

Mountains of the Ross Dependency
Shackleton Coast